Austrolittorina fernandezensis is a species of sea snail, a marine gastropod mollusk in the family Littorinidae, the winkles or periwinkles.

References

 Reid, D.G. & Williams, S.T. (2004) The subfamily Littorininae (Gastropoda: Littorinidae) in the temperate Southern Hemisphere: the genera Nodilittorina, Austrolittorina and Afrolittorina. Records of the Australian Museum 56: 75122.

Littorinidae
Gastropods described in 1870